Time and Magik is a trilogy of interactive fiction games by Level 9. The individual games were initially released separately in 1983-1986. In 1988 the three games were revised, expanded and re-released together as a compilation by Mandarin Software, a division of Europress Software.

The Games

Lords of Time

Father Time sends the player to different time zones to secure nine treasures that help to fight the evil Lords of Time.

Red Moon

Red Moon Crystal, a powerful source of Magik, has been stolen and must be recovered to save the country of Baskalos from destruction. The game won the award for best adventure game of the year in Crash magazine, and the game was voted best adventure game of the year at the Golden Joystick Awards.

The Price of Magik

Sequel to the previous game; Myglar the Magician, guardian of the Crystal, has become insane and is draining its energy for his own use; he must be defeated before it is exhausted.

References

External links

Time and Magik at the Amiga Hall of Light
Time and Magik at Lemon 64
History of Time and Magik

1983 video games
1985 video games
1986 video games
1988 video games
1980s interactive fiction
Amiga games
Amstrad CPC games
Amstrad PCW games
Atari 8-bit family games
Atari ST games
BBC Micro and Acorn Electron games
Commodore 64 games
DOS games
Golden Joystick Award winners
Level 9 Computing games
Trilogies
Video game compilations
Video game franchises introduced in 1983
Video game remakes
Video games developed in the United Kingdom
ZX Spectrum games